The 1923 Ohio Green and White football team represented Ohio University as a member of the Ohio Athletic Conference (OAC) during the 1923 college football season. Led by first-year head coach John C. Heldt, the Green and White compiled an overall record of 3–5–1 with a mark of 2–4 in conference play.

Schedule

References

Ohio
Ohio Bobcats football seasons
Ohio Green and White football